Brian Tate Milner (born November 17, 1959) is a former professional baseball player. He played two games in Major League Baseball for the Toronto Blue Jays in 1978 as a catcher.

Career
Milner was drafted in the 7th round of the 1978 amateur draft by the Toronto Blue Jays and called up almost immediately, the only catcher to be brought directly to the major leagues after being signed since the draft began in 1965, and the first Blue Jays player to do so. Making his debut at the age of eighteen years and seven months, he remains the youngest person to play for the team. Milner played in two games in June 1978, getting four hits, including a triple, in nine at bats, scoring three runs, and picking up two RBIs.

Milner was sent down to the rookie league Medicine Hat Blue Jays shortly thereafter, where he hit .337. He played four more seasons in the minor leagues, but suffered a series of injuries and never played in the major leagues again. He later served as a hitting coach in the New York Yankees organization from 1991–95, and as a scout for the Chicago Cubs from 1996–2007.

Milner is the father of Major League pitcher Hoby Milner.

See also
List of baseball players who went directly to Major League Baseball

References

External links

1959 births
Living people
American expatriate baseball players in Canada
Baseball players from Fort Worth, Texas
Chicago Cubs scouts
Dunedin Blue Jays players
Kinston Eagles players
Knoxville Blue Jays players
Major League Baseball catchers
Medicine Hat Blue Jays players
Toronto Blue Jays players